Jeremy A. Rabkin (born July 15, 1952) is a professor of law at Antonin Scalia Law School at George Mason University, where he teaches constitutional law and international law. Prior to joining the George Mason faculty in 2007, he spent 27 years as a professor of government at Cornell University. He holds a Ph.D. in government from Harvard University and graduated summa cum laude with a B.A. from Cornell.

Rabkin has written numerous books, chapters, papers, articles, and essays. Known for excellence in teaching, in 1999 and 2001 he was awarded the title of "Cornell's Most Influential Teacher." Among his famous students include New York Times best-selling author Ann Coulter.

Rabkin is a board member of the United States Institute of Peace and a member of the Council of Academic Advisers at the American Enterprise Institute. His interests include national security law and early constitutional history.

See also
Independent Women's Forum
Loren Smith
Stephen F. Williams
United Nations Convention on the Law of the Sea

References

External links
 

1952 births
Living people
George Mason University faculty
Harvard University alumni
Cornell University alumni